Brian Shawn Myrow (born September 4, 1976) is former American baseball player.

Early and personal life
Myrow was born on September 4, 1976, in Fort Worth, Texas.  He attended Louisiana Tech University.  He is married and has two sons.

Professional career

Winnipeg Goldeyes

New York Yankees
The New York Yankees purchased Myrow in June . It was the first time he played affiliated baseball. On May 15, the Yankees traded Myrow to the Los Angeles Dodgers for Tanyon Sturtze.

Los Angeles Dodgers
On May 15, the Yankees traded Myrow to the Los Angeles Dodgers for Tanyon Sturtze. Myrow made his Major League Baseball debut with the Dodgers on September 6, .

Korea Baseball Organization
In 2006, Myrow joined the Lotte Giants of the Korea Baseball Organization.

Boston Red Sox
In August , Myrow signed with the Boston Red Sox organization.

San Diego Padres

Myrow signed as a minor league free agent with the San Diego Padres in November 2006. Myrow hit his first career home run on July 8, off Logan Kensing against the Florida Marlins at Petco Park. He became a free agent at the end of the 2008 season and signed a minor league contract with the Chicago White Sox.

Chicago White Sox
He became a free agent at the end of the 2008 season and signed a minor league contract with the Chicago White Sox. On June 23, Myrow was traded to the Pittsburgh Pirates for cash considerations.

Pittsburgh Pirates
On June 23, Myrow was traded to the Pittsburgh Pirates for cash considerations.

Back to Independent Baseball
In 2011, he returned to the Winnipeg Goldeyes, to play for the organization that launched his professional career. He started 2012 with the Grand Prairie AirHogs. He remained with the AirHogs in 2013 before retiring to become their hitting coach.

References

External links

1976 births
Living people
American expatriate baseball players in Canada
American expatriate baseball players in South Korea
Baseball players from Texas
Charlotte Knights players
Columbus Clippers players
Grand Prairie AirHogs players
Indianapolis Indians players
KBO League outfielders
Las Vegas 51s players
Los Angeles Dodgers players
Lotte Giants players
Louisiana Tech Bulldogs baseball players
Major League Baseball first basemen
Norwich Navigators players
People from Fort Worth, Texas
Portland Beavers players
Portland Sea Dogs players
San Diego Padres players
Tampa Yankees players
Trenton Thunder players
Winnipeg Goldeyes players